The 2000 Yunnan earthquake occurred on January 14 at 23:37 UTC, in Yunnan, China.  The earthquake killed 7 people, and caused much damage in central Yunnan Province.

The quake was moderate, with a magnitude of 5.9; however, it left 2,528 injured, 92,479 homeless and destroyed over 41,000 homes.

It was preceded by a magnitude 5.5 foreshock at 22:09 on the same day.

Tectonic setting
Yunnan lies within the area affected by the continuing collision between the India Plate and the Eurasian Plate that has led to the formation of the Tibetan Plateau. Lateral eastward spreading of this zone of thickened crust is impeded by the presence of the South China Block and this causes clockwise rotation of the Sichuan–Yunnan block, accommodated by left-lateral strike-slip faults on its eastern margin and right lateral strike-slip faults to the west.

Earthquake
The earthquake sequence started with two foreshocks at 22:09 (M5.5) and 22:23 (M3.9) on January 14. The mainshock, which occurred soon afterwards at 23:37, had an estimated magnitude of 5.9  (ANSS), 6.0  or 6.5 . It was followed within the hour by a 4.5  aftershock.

Based on the aftershock distribution, the earthquake was the result of rupture along a fault with a strike of N50°W. The causative fault was most likely the right lateral Maweiqing fault, one of the faults that forms the western boundary of the Sichuan-Yunnan block.

See also
List of earthquakes in 2000
List of earthquakes in Yunnan
List of earthquakes in China

References

External links

2000 Yunnan
2000 earthquakes
2000 in China
January 2000 events in Asia
2000 disasters in China
Geography of Chuxiong Yi Autonomous Prefecture
Yao'an County